Ha Seung-un (born 4 May 1998) is a South Korean football forward who plays for Gwangju FC.

References

External links 
 

1998 births
Living people
Association football forwards
South Korean footballers
K League 1 players
K League 2 players
Pohang Steelers players
Jeonnam Dragons players
FC Anyang players
Gwangju FC players